Tami Perriello is an American government official serving as the Chief Financial Officer of the Small Business Administration. She held the position of acting administrator of the SBA from January 20, 2021, to March 17, 2021. Perriello has previously served as the associate administrator and CFO for the Pipeline and Hazardous Materials Safety Administration.

References 

Biden administration cabinet members
Johns Hopkins University alumni
Rochester Institute of Technology alumni
Living people
Year of birth missing (living people)